These are lists of films sorted by the film studio that made them.

Belgium
List of Inti Films films

China

Hong Kong 
List of Golden Harvest productions
List of Shaw Brothers films

Germany
List of Tobis Film films

India
List of Dharma Productions films
List of films released by Eros International
List of Red Chillies Entertainment films
List of films produced by Shree Venkatesh Films
List of Star Studios films
List of films released by Yash Raj Films

Japan
Art Theatre Guild filmography
List of Daiei Films
List of Nikkatsu Roman Porno films
List of Shochiku films
List of Toho films
List of Toei films

United Kingdom
 Gainsborough Pictures
 British and Dominions Film Corporation
 British Lion Films
 British National Films Company
 Butcher's Film Service
 ITC Entertainment
 Hammer Film Productions
 Ealing Studios
 Stoll Pictures
 Two Cities Films

United States

Majors
Warner Bros./Warner Bros. Pictures
Warner Animation Group
New Line Cinema
Castle Rock Entertainment
HBO Films
First National Pictures
Monogram Pictures / Allied Artists Pictures
Sony/Sony Pictures
Columbia Pictures
TriStar Pictures
Sony Pictures Classics
Sony Pictures Animation
Comcast/Universal Studios
Focus Features
Illumination
DreamWorks Animation
Paramount Global/Paramount Pictures
Paramount British
Republic Pictures
CBS
Miramax Films
The Walt Disney Company/The Walt Disney Studios
Walt Disney Studios
Walt Disney Pictures
Walt Disney Animation Studios
Pixar
Touchstone Pictures
Marvel Studios
ABC
Lucasfilm
20th Century Studios
Fox Film
20th Century Pictures
Searchlight Pictures
Blue Sky Studios

Mini-Majors
A24
Amblin Partners
Amblin Entertainment
DreamWorks Pictures
Amazon/MGM
Metro-Goldwyn-Mayer
Metro Pictures
United Artists
Orion Pictures
The Cannon Group
Lions Gate Entertainment
Lionsgate
Summit Entertainment
STX Entertainment
Lantern Entertainment
The Weinstein Company
Dimension Films

Streaming Services
Netflix
Netflix original films
List of Netflix original programming
List of ended Netflix original programming
List of Netflix India originals
List of Netflix exclusive international distribution TV shows
List of Netflix Animation theatrical animated feature films
Hulu
List of Hulu original films
List of Hulu original programming
Disney+
List of Disney+ original films
List of Disney+ original programming
List of Star+ original programming
List of Star (Disney+) original programming
ESPN+
List of ESPN+ original programming
HBO Max
List of HBO Max original films
List of HBO Max original programming
 List of DC Universe original programming
Discovery+
List of Discovery+ original programming
Paramount+
List of Paramount+ original films
List of Paramount+ original programming
List of BET+ original programming
Peacock (streaming service)
List of Peacock original programming
Amazon/Amazon Prime Video/Amazon Studios
List of Amazon Studios films
List of Amazon Prime Video original programming
List of Amazon India originals
List of Amazon Prime Video exclusive international distribution programming
List of Amazon Freevee original programming
Apple TV+
List of Apple TV+ original films
List of Apple TV+ original programming
Crackle (service)
List of Crackle original programming
List of SonyLIV original programming
YouTube
List of YouTube Premium original programming
The Roku Channel
List of Quibi original programming
Facebook
List of Facebook Watch original programming
Snapchat
List of Snapchat original programming
Globoplay
List of Globoplay original programming
Eros Now
List of Eros Now original programming
Shudder
List of Shudder original programming
Xbox
List of Xbox Entertainment Studios original programming
iWantTFC
List of iWantTFC original programming
Tencent Video
List of Tencent Video original programming
Stan (service)
List of Stan original programming
Yahoo!
List of Yahoo! Screen original programming
iQIYI
List of iQIYI original programming

Other Studios
Chesterfield Pictures
Eagle-Lion Films
Embassy Pictures
Film Booking Offices of America
Grand National Pictures
Legendary Pictures
Lippert Pictures
Neon
Producers Releasing Corporation
Relativity Media
RKO Pictures
Saban Films
StudioCanal
Tiffany Pictures
Triangle Films
Troma
Vitagraph
World Film

See also
 Lists of films
 List of film studios